Wendy Molyneux and Lizzie Molyneux-Logelin, known collectively as the Molyneux sisters, are American screenwriters and television producers.

Career
They have written for Bob's Burgers since 2011, and won a Primetime Emmy Award for Outstanding Animated Program in 2017 and an Annie Award in 2017 for writing "The Hormone-iums". Along with Minty Lewis, the pair co-created the animated sitcom The Great North, which premiered on January 3, 2021. On November 20, 2020, it was announced that they would write the screenplay alongside returning screenwriters Rhett Reese and Paul Wernick for the third Deadpool film, set in the Marvel Cinematic Universe (MCU).

The Molyneuxs are originally from Indiana, but grew up in Southern California. Wendy is a 1997 graduate of Pomona College, and is married to writer Jeff Drake, with whom she has four children. Lizzie is married to writer Matt Logelin, with whom she has 2 children.

Filmography

Film

Television

References

External links
 
 

Sister duos
American television producers
Annie Award winners
Primetime Emmy Award winners
American women television writers
American women screenwriters
Screenwriting duos